On May 20, 1891, a destructive F4 tornado struck rural areas of central Missouri where it leveled numerous farms, leaving 12 fatalities and $50,000 (1891 USD) in damage.

Storm
The tornado was first reported touching down near Sturgeon before moving eastward where it struck several homes. One house was completely leveled with no survivors.  The storm continued on where it struck another house killing all of its occupants and then later struck a jail and several farms resulting in eleven more fatalities before continuing eastward before dissipating. During its 35 mile (56.3 km) path, the storm left up to twelve fatalities and $15,000 (1891 USD) in damage.

Observation
People observing the tornado noticed the storm exhibiting either several multiple vortices or satellite tornadoes as it continued to do damage. Also there were reports of the tornado glowing and producing lightning which resulted in the deaths of several livestock and damage to the telegraph system in the area.

References 

Tornadoes in Missouri
F4 tornadoes
Tornadoes of 1891